Ayutovo (Ayıw) is a rural locality (a village) in Isyangulovsky Selsoviet, Zianchurinsky District, Bashkortostan, Russia. The population was 129 as of 2010. There are 2 streets.

Geography 
Ayutovo is located 9 km southwest of Isyangulovo (the district's administrative centre) by road. Novomikhaylovka is the nearest rural locality.

References 

Rural localities in Zianchurinsky District